Bernadetta Blechacz (born 30 July 1955 in Kcynia, Kuyavian-Pomeranian) is a former javelin thrower from Poland, who set her personal best in 1979, throwing 62.76 metres. She competed for her native country at the 1980 Summer Olympics in Moscow, USSR, finishing in ninth place (61.46 metres) in the overall-rankings.

References
sports-reference

1955 births
Living people
People from Kcynia
Polish female javelin throwers
Athletes (track and field) at the 1980 Summer Olympics
Olympic athletes of Poland
Sportspeople from Kuyavian-Pomeranian Voivodeship
Lechia Gdańsk athletes